Kim Byung-ki (born November 2, 1948) is a South Korean actor.

Filmography

Television series

Film

Awards and nominations

References

External links 
 
 

1948 births
Living people
South Korean male television actors
South Korean male film actors
Chung-Ang University alumni